Belomorsk (/) is a town and the administrative center of Belomorsky District of the Republic of Karelia, Russia, located on the Onega Bay on the shore of the White Sea. Population:

History
In the beginning it was a small village named Soroka, or Sorotskaya in the official Russian Imperial statistics. On September 11, 1938, Soroka and several nearby localities were merged to form the town of Belomorsk. In 1941-1944, during World War II, it served as the temporary capital of the Karelo-Finnish Soviet Socialist Republic.

Administrative and municipal status
Within the framework of administrative divisions, Belomorsk serves as the administrative center of Belomorsky District, to which it is directly subordinated. As a municipal division, the town of Belomorsk, together with eleven rural localities, is incorporated within Belomorsky Municipal District as Belomorskoye Urban Settlement.

Culture
Belomorsk is the cultural center of Pomorye. Historical places nearby include Zalavruga and Besovy Sledki with ancient petroglyphs.

Transportation

Belomorsk is situated on the mouth of the White Sea – Baltic Canal. The town can be said to be situated at the entrance to the canal, the end point of the waterway system being in St. Petersburg. The Kirov Railway connects Belomorsk with Murmansk and St. Petersburg. A new port is being constructed in Belomorsk that will have a capacity of nine million tons of cargo by 2014. In a second stage the capacity can be increased to fifteen million tons. The port will not be ice-free year around, but will nevertheless operate without interruption by using icebreakers during winter.

References

Notes

Sources

External links
Official website of Belomorsk 
Directory of organizations in Belomorsk 
Belomorskiye Petroglify Belomorsk District Museum of Local Lore 

Cities and towns in the Republic of Karelia
Belomorsky District
Kemsky Uyezd
White Sea